Stanislav Boyadzhiev (15 July 1945 – 19 April 2020) was a Bulgarian basketball player. He competed in the men's tournament at the 1968 Summer Olympics.

References

External links
 
 

1945 births
2020 deaths
Bulgarian men's basketball players
Olympic basketball players of Bulgaria
Basketball players at the 1968 Summer Olympics
Basketball players from Sofia